Gee Records was a New York-based American record label formed as a subsidiary to Gloria Gee George Goldner's Tico Records and Rama Records labels in 1953 to honor the million selling hit song "Gee" (1953). Sometime in 1955 Goldner (an inveterate gambler) sold 50% of Gee to Joe Kolsky who was a business partner of  Morris Levy. Kolsky and Goldner then opened another label Roulette Records in 1957 with Levy as president.  A few months later, Goldner sold his shares of Roulette, Rama, Gee, and Tico to the Morris Levy Combine.  Goldner then proceeded that year to open two new companies Gone Records and End Records. Gee Records eventually became deactivated. When Gee Records was reactivated as a division of Roulette Records by president Morris Levy in early April 1961, The Cleftones' hit "Heart and Soul" (1961) became Gee Records first release.

Gee Records artists

The Crows
The Cleftones
Frankie Lymon & the Teenagers
The Regents
The Rosebuds

See also
 List of record labels

References

American record labels
Record labels established in 1953
Record labels disestablished in 1957